Quercus dinghuensis is a rare species of tree in the beech family. It has been found only in a small region in southern China, in the Dinghu Shan area in the Province of Guangdong. It is placed in subgenus Cerris, section Cyclobalanopsis.

Quercus dinghuensis is a small tree up to 8 meters tall with woolly, grayish-brown twigs, and leaves as much as 9 cm long.

References

External links
line drawing, Flora of China Illustrations vol. 4, figure 375, drawings 1-4 at left

dinghuensis
Flora of Guangdong
Plants described in 1978